Fr. Agnel School, is a private co-educational English medium school run by the Society of the Missionaries of St. Francis Xavier, Pilar in New Delhi, India. It was established by Fr. Conceicao Rodrigues, an Agnel Ashram priest in 1979. The school is situated in Gautam Nagar, New Delhi.

History
The school was established in 1979 in  South Extension, New Delhi, and subsequently shifted to its present campus in Gautam Nagar, which was inaugurated on 3 April 1985. It received recognition from Delhi Government on 1 May 1981.

The school is named after Fr. Agnelo de Souza (1869 - 1927), a Roman Catholic priest of the Society of the Missionaries of St. Francis Xavier, Pilar who performed missionary work in Goa.

In 2012, it was rated by the Hindustan Times, as amongst leading schools of South Delhi.

The school also runs drug de-addiction service.

References

Catholic secondary schools in India
Christian schools in Delhi
South Delhi district
Educational institutions established in 1979
1979 establishments in Delhi